Scott Allan Wimmer (born January 26, 1976) is an American professional stock car racing driver. He has a total of six wins in the Xfinity Series. His brother Chris Wimmer competed in the Busch Series. Wimmer co-owns State Park Speedway in Wausau, Wisconsin.

Youth
Wimmer competed in the United States National Junior Olympics in downhill and slalom skiing at age 14, and finished 13th of the 150 competitors. His father began as the owner of his uncle Larry Detjens' racing team. Detjens was a champion late model racer who competed at Slinger Super Speedway and Wisconsin International Raceway. Detjens had a race named after him after his death in 1981.

Pre-NASCAR racing career
Wimmer started racing at State Park Speedway in Wausau, Wisconsin in 1991 at age 15. He moved up through the ranks, and became a well-known driver in the Midwest. He moved down south, and in 1997 was the Rookie of the Year in the Hooters Cup late model series. He later finished second for the Rookie of the Year in the American Speed Association (ASA) series in 2000. He began the season with no sponsor for his family-owned team, but was able to run the full season after winning the first two races of the year. He also made his Winston Cup debut.

NASCAR career

2000–2005
Wimmer made his NASCAR debut in 2000, when he was signed to drive the No. 20 AT&T-sponsored Pontiac Grand Prix for Bill Davis Racing in the Busch Series. After failing to qualify for his first race at North Carolina Speedway, he finished 18th in his debut at Memphis, followed by a 19th-place finish at Phoenix. He also made his Winston Cup debut at Atlanta, driving a car he had originally intended to drive at an ARCA RE/MAX Series race that weekend. The qualifying session was rained out for that race, and he was able to take his No. 23 car and enter in the Cup race. He finished 22nd and led nine laps in that race.

He was named Davis' permanent driver of the No. 23 Jani-King-sponsored Pontiac in the 2001. He had two Top 5 finishes, eight Top 10 finishes and finished 11th in points, second to Greg Biffle for the Rookie of the Year title. The team only had a sponsorship from Siemens for half of the races in 2002, and many rumors circulated that the team would shut down. The team remained open, and Wimmer won four races in the fall of that season at Dover, Memphis, Phoenix, and Homestead, and finished third in points. Davis was able to get Siemens sponsorship for Wimmer to run seven races in a No. 27 car in the Cup Series, but Wimmer was only able to make two of them.  Wimmer also substituted in the No. 23 Hills Brothers Coffee-sponsored car at Talladega earning a season's best finish of 17th.

He got full-time sponsorships from Stacker 2, YJ Stinger, and Stamina Rx in 2003, but after losing crew chief Bootie Barker and switching to Chevrolet, he won only one race at Pikes Peak with four Top 5 finishes, 12 Top 10s, and finished ninth in points.  Wimmer ran two races in the No. 27 YJ Stinger-sponsored Chevrolet finishing 24th in both races at Bristol and New Hampshire.  With four races left in the 2003 NASCAR Winston Cup Series, Wimmer was promoted to drive Bill Davis Racing's No. 22 Caterpillar Inc.-sponsored Dodge. In his second race in the No. 22, he earned his first Cup Series Top 10 finish (a ninth) at Phoenix.

At the end of the season, Wimmer was named the full-time driver for 2004 in the No. 22 Caterpillar-sponsored Dodge. Before the 2004 season, he was arrested in High Point, North Carolina for driving while intoxicated. He was later convicted and sentenced to probation and 24-hour community service. He began the year with a very strong performance at the Daytona 500, and appeared in contention to win after the final set of pit stops, but without drafting help, Wimmer was easily overtaken by Dale Earnhardt Jr. and Tony Stewart, and ended up finishing third. After this, despite leading laps at a number of other races, Wimmer only had one other Top 10 at Dover and finished 27th in points, due in part for failing to qualify for one race. The Davis team struggled in 2004; the Cup operation was reduced to only one car and the season was plagued with a lawsuit from Dodge.  He ran the full season again in 2005, but did not finish higher than 11th in a race that season. He was dismissed from Bill Davis Racing by mail at the end of the season after only managing to squander up a 32nd in the point standings.  The nature of his firing later led to a lawsuit against Bill Davis Racing.

2006–2011
Wimmer joined Morgan-McClure Motorsports in 2006 to drive their No. 4 Aero Exhaust-sponsored Chevy. Due to nonpayment, the team lost sponsorship from Aero during the summer of the 2006 season, and Wimmer subsequently left the team following the race at Kansas Speedway. Wimmer then joined with Richard Childress Racing as a test driver for the remainder of the season and was signed to drive for the 2007 Busch Series season.  Wimmer drove the final Cup race of the 2006 season at Homestead-Miami Speedway in the No. 33 Holiday Inn-sponsored Chevrolet earning a season-best finish of 12th. In all, Wimmer missed 12 Cup races in 2006, and finished 38th in points. That year he also drove in 16 races, part-time, in the Busch Series for the No. 66 Duraflame/Yard-Man/United States Postal Service-sponsored Ford Taurus with Brewco Motorsports He also ran three races for Fitz Bradshaw Racing, two in the No. 14 Family Dollar-sponsored Dodge and one in the No. 12 Goulds Pumps-sponsored Dodge. Wimmer had four top-ten finishes, culminating the Busch season 29th in points.

In 2007, he joined Richard Childress Racing. He competed in 22 races between the No. 21 AutoZone-sponsored Chevy (6 races) and No. 29 Holiday Inn-sponsored Chevy (16 races). He also drove one race for KHI at Fontana in Harvick's #77 Dollar General-sponsored Chevrolet (12th). He won his first career pole at Gateway International Raceway and had seven Top 5 finishes and 14 Top 10 finishes. Wimmer finished 14th in points despite his limited schedule. Wimmer shared the No. 29 car with Jeff Burton and with Burton's five wins, twelve top-five finishes and seventeen top-ten finishes combined with Wimmer's finishes, the No. 29 team won the 2007 Busch Series Owner's Championship. At the time, it was only the second instance in Busch Series history that the Drivers' and Owners' Championships were not won by the same team. In the Nextel Cup Series, Wimmer attempted one race in the No. 78 Furniture Row Racing car at Michigan and five races for Childress in his No. 33 Chevrolet with sponsorships from Holiday Inn (4 races) and Camping World (1 race). He only qualified for one race (Indianapolis), finishing 31st after a pit road accident damaged his car.

In 2008, Wimmer increased his second-tier schedule by running 22 races in the No. 29 Holiday Inn-sponsored Chevrolet and one in the No. 21 Prilosec-sponsored Chevrolet for Childress in newly renamed 2008 NASCAR Nationwide Series. Wimmer picked up a win at Nashville, his first win since 2003. It was also his 6th and final career victory in the Series. Wimmer also had five top-five finishes and thirteen top-ten finishes helping the No. 29 finish fifth in Owner's Points while Wimmer ended up 17th in points, running only a part-time schedule.  Wimmer also attempted one race in the 2008 Sprint Cup Series, failing to make the race at Richmond in the No. 33 Camping World-sponsored Chevrolet for Richard Childress Racing.

Due to the lack of a sponsorship, he was released from Childress and he spent the 2009 season splitting time between the No. 5 Fastenal-sponsored Chevy for JR Motorsports in six races and the No. 40 StopRepairBills.com/Westerman Companies Chevy for Key Motorsports in the majority of races in the Nationwide Series. He would end up with three Top 10's and finished 16th in Driver Points.  Wimmer also returned to Morgan-McClure Motorsports in the Sprint Cup Series driving one race at Bristol in the No. 4 Alpha Natural Resources-sponsored Chevrolet finishing 29th.  Wimmer failed to make the race for MMM at Dover.  Outside of his NASCAR endeavors, Wimmer and his father bought and made major improvements to State Park Speedway in Wausau, WI, in the fall of 2009.

In 2010, Wimmer decided to only drive high quality equipment in the Nationwide Series.  Because of this, Wimmer started the season without a ride.  He got a two race ride with JR Motorsports in the No. 7 Chevrolet at Bristol and Nashville.  He was able to get finishes of 10th and seventh respectively.  Wimmer then earned a three race ride with Baker Curb Racing in the No. 27 Red Man-sponsored Ford.  His best finish with them was a seventh at Kentucky Speedway.  Any hopes to continue with them ended when their Red Man sponsorship expired.  Wimmer spent most of the rest of the season without a ride but was able to get a one race deal with Turner Motorsports (NASCAR).  He drove the No. 10 AccuDoc Solutions-sponsored Toyota at Gateway International Raceway but crashed out.  In 2010, Wimmer had three Top 10 finishes in six races and led laps in five of the races he ran.

Wimmer started the 2011 Nationwide Series season driving the No. 40 for Key Motorsports earning a best finish of 12th at Talladega before leaving after the 11th race due to the lack of a sponsorship.  After leaving, Wimmer drove three races for the No. 70 of ML Motorsports with twice a best finish of 15th, both at races at Iowa Speedway.  He also drove one race each for No. 87 Nemco Motorsports at Nashville Speedway (Finished 13th), No. 40 Key Motorsports at Bristol Motor Speedway (Finished 24th) and No. 81 McDonald Motorsports at Chicagoland Speedway (Finished 30th).  In addition to these full race rides, Wimmer start and parked a few races for R3 Motorsports (1 race), Key Motorsports (2 races) and McDonald Motorsports (1 race).  Despite only running 21 of 34 races, Wimmer used six Top 20 finishes to help him to finish 25th in points.

Wimmer was also able to run a few Sprint Cup Series races in 2011 for Robby Gordon Motorsports.  Wimmer substituted for Gordon in the No. 7 Speed Energy-sponsored Dodge at Dover International Speedway, Pocono Raceway, Kentucky Speedway and New Hampshire Motor Speedway; earning a best finish of 27th at New Hampshire.  In addition, Wimmer attempted to qualify a second Speed Energy-sponsored car (#77) at Charlotte Motor Speedway and Indianapolis Motor Speedway but he failed to qualify for either race.

After NASCAR
In 2012, Wimmer partnered with Russ Blakeley, Jim Budzinski and Kurt Wise to form Wild Motorsports.  The team ran the ASA Midwest Tour race at the Milwaukee Mile in June and announced plans to run the Nationwide Series starting with the September race at Richmond with the goal of running the full 2013 schedule.  The team was never able to obtain sponsorship and never attempted a race.  During 2012, Wimmer took the position of driver coach/spotter for up and coming driver Cody Coughlin, who ran a variety of short track series.

Wimmer continued in 2013 to be a spotter/coach for Coughlin and helped him to two wins and the championship in the JEGS/CRA All-Stars Tour.

In early 2014, Coughlin was signed by Joe Gibbs Racing to a driver development contract.  Coughlin ran a limited schedule in his Team JEGS Late Model in the ARCA/CRA Super Series and with Venturini Motorsports in the ARCA Racing Series in the No. 55 JEGS High Performance-sponsored Toyota.  Coughlin ran 11 races with three Top 5s, 8 Top 10s and a best finish of 4th.  Wimmer continued his role as spotter/coach to Coughlin in both series along with running State Park Speedway.

On July 26, Wimmer returned to driving when he drove Coughlin's No. 1 JEGS Late Model in the 34th annual Larry Detjens Memorial 125 at his State Park Speedway.  He started 16th and finished 13th.

Wimmer continued to help guide Coughlin in 2015.  Coughlin drove the No. 55 JEGS Toyota in the ARCA Racing Series for Venturini Motorsports in 6 races winning poles at Talladega and Chicagoland with a best finish of 2nd at Talladega.  Coughlin made his Camping World Truck Series debut for Venturini in the No. 25 JEGS Toyota at Kentucky finishing 20th.  Coughlin would join Kyle Busch Motorsports in August, driving their No. 54 at Michigan to a 20th-place finish.

Wimmer remained Coughlin's spotter/coach in 2016 when he drove 9 races for Kyle Busch Motorsports in their No. 51 (8 races) and No. 18 (1 race) trucks and 1 race for Athenian Motorsports (No. 05) in the Camping World Truck Series.  He had a best finish of 12th at Texas.  Coughlin also was able to win championships in the ARCA/CRA Super Series and JEGS/CRA All-Star Tour.

Wimmer and Coughlin's association would end in January 2017 when Coughlin joined ThorSport Racing.  ThorSport's former driver Terry Cook assumed the role of spotter/coach for Coughlin when he joined the team.

Motorsports career results

NASCAR
(key) (Bold – Pole position awarded by qualifying time. Italics – Pole position earned by points standings or practice time. * – Most laps led.)

Sprint Cup Series

Daytona 500

Nationwide Series

Camping World Truck Series

 Ineligible for series championship points.

ARCA Bondo/Mar-Hyde Series
(key) (Bold – Pole position awarded by qualifying time. Italics – Pole position earned by points standings or practice time. * – Most laps led.)

References

External links

 
 

Living people
1976 births
Sportspeople from Wausau, Wisconsin
Racing drivers from Wisconsin
NASCAR drivers
CARS Tour drivers
American Speed Association drivers
Caterpillar Inc. people
Richard Childress Racing drivers
ARCA Midwest Tour drivers
JR Motorsports drivers